John Isner successfully defended his title by beating Lleyton Hewitt 7–6(7–1), 6–4 in the final.

Seeds

Draw

Finals

Top half

Bottom half

Qualifying

Seeds

Qualifiers

Draw

First qualifier

Second qualifier

Third qualifier

Fourth qualifier

References

 Main Draw
 Qualifying Draw

Campbell's Hall of Fame Tennis Championships - Singles